Kosmos 2380 ( meaning Cosmos 2380) is one of a set of three Russian military satellites launched in 2001 as part of the GLONASS satellite navigation system. It was launched with Kosmos 2381 and Kosmos 2382.

This satellite is a GLONASS satellite, also known as Uragan, and is numbered Uragan No. 790.

Kosmos 2380/1/2 were launched from Site 81/24 at Baikonur Cosmodrome in Kazakhstan. A Proton-K carrier rocket with a Blok DM upper stage was used to perform the launch which took place at 18:04 UTC on 1 December 2001. The launch successfully placed the satellites into Medium Earth orbit. It subsequently received its Kosmos designation, and the international designator 2001-053C. The United States Space Command assigned it the Satellite Catalog Number 26989.

It was in the first orbital plane in orbital slot 6. It is no longer part of the GLONASS constellation.

See also

List of Kosmos satellites (2251–2500)
List of Proton launches (2000–2009)

References

Spacecraft launched in 2001
Spacecraft launched by Proton rockets
Kosmos satellites
2001 in Russia